The maneki-neko (招き猫) is a common Japanese figurine which is often believed to bring good luck to the owner. In modern times, they are usually made of ceramic or plastic. The figurine depicts a cat, traditionally a calico Japanese Bobtail, with a paw raised in a Japanese beckoning gesture. The figurines are often displayed in shops, restaurants, pachinko parlors, dry cleaners, laundromats, bars, casinos, hotels, nightclubs, and other businesses, generally near the entrance. Some maneki-neko are equipped with a mechanical paw which slowly moves back and forth. 

Maneki-neko come in different colors and styles and vary in degrees of detail. Common colors are white, black, red, and gold. In addition to statues, maneki-neko can be found in the form of keychains, piggy banks, air fresheners, pots, and numerous other media. Maneki-neko are sometimes referred to simply as "lucky cats".

Common features
Maneki-neko are traditionally depicted seated, holding a koban coin, with one paw raised in a beckoning gesture. To some Westerners (Italians, Spaniards and Greeks are notable exceptions) it may seem as if the maneki-neko is waving rather than beckoning. This is due to the difference in gestures and body language recognized by some Westerners and the Japanese. The Japanese beckoning gesture is made by holding up the hand, palm down, and repeatedly folding the fingers down and back, thus the cat's appearance. Some maneki-neko made specifically for some Western markets will have the cat's paw facing upwards, in a beckoning gesture that is more familiar to most Westerners.

Maneki-neko can be found with either the right or left paw raised (and sometimes both). The significance of the right and left raised paw differs with time and place. A statue with the left paw raised is to get more customers, while the right paw raised is to get more money. Hence it is also said that the one with left paw is for business and the right is for home.

Battery- and solar-powered maneki-neko are a modern iteration.

Colors 

Originally, maneki-neko were white, but over the years with the combination of Feng Shui, different color variations were born. The original white color is to get good luck and overall good fortune, while black is to ward off evil, red is for good health, yellow or gold is for wealth, and pink is for romance.

Composition
Antique examples of maneki-neko may be made of carved wood, stone and metal, handmade porcelain or cast iron.

Origins

History
It is commonly believed that maneki-neko originated in Tokyo (then named Edo), while some insist it was Kyoto. Maneki-neko first appeared during the later part of the Edo period in Japan. The earliest records of maneki-neko appear in the Bukō nenpyō's (a chronology of Edo) entry dated 1852. Utagawa Hiroshige's ukiyo-e "Joruri-machi Hanka no zu," painted also in 1852, depicts the Marushime-neko, a variation of maneki-neko, being sold at Senso temple, Tokyo. In 1876, during the Meiji era, it was mentioned in a newspaper article, and there is evidence that kimono-clad maneki-neko were distributed at a shrine in Osaka during this time. A 1902 advertisement for maneki-neko indicates that by the turn of the century they were popular. Beyond this the exact origins of maneki-neko are uncertain.

Some have noted the similarities between the maneki-neko's gesture and that of a cat washing its face. There is a Japanese belief that a cat washing its face means a visitor will soon arrive. This belief may in turn be related to an even older Chinese proverb that states that if a cat washes its face, it will rain. Thus, it is possible a belief arose that a figure of a cat washing its face would bring in customers. In his Miscellaneous Morsels from Youyang, China's Tang Dynasty author Duan Chengshi (803?–863) wrote: "If a cat raises its paw over the ears and washes its face, then patrons will come". Statues of cats washing their ears (though very different in style to maneki-neko) have been found as early as the Northern Wei Dynasty (386 to 534 AD).

According to a folktale, the operator of an impoverished shop (or inn, tavern, temple, etc.) took in a starving stray cat despite barely having enough to feed himself. In gratitude, the cat sat in the front of the store beckoning customers, thus bringing prosperity as a reward to the charitable proprietor. Ever after, the "beckoning cat" has been a symbol of good luck for small business owners.

In popular culture
Because of its popularity in Chinese and Vietnamese communities (including Chinatowns in the United States), the maneki-neko is frequently mistaken for being Chinese in origin rather than Japanese, and is therefore sometimes referred to as a "Chinese lucky cat" or jīnmāo ("golden cat").

A Pokémon named Meowth is based on maneki-neko.

Netta performed her song "Toy" in front of two walls full of maneki-neko at the Eurovision Song Contest 2018. She won the competition after collecting 529 points at the final.

A maneki-neko is also seen in the production logo for Funimation.

Lucky Cat Lolla, the mascot of the music festival Lollapalooza, is a rendition of a maneki-neko.

Science fiction author Bruce Sterling wrote a short story titled "Maneki Neko," first published in The Magazine of Fantasy & Science Fiction in May 1998.

Mike Goutokuji, the stage 1 boss of Touhou Kōryūdō ~ Unconnected Marketeers, is a maneki-neko.

Gallery

See also

 Bakeneko
 Daruma doll
 Fukusuke
 Hello Kitty
 Jin Chan (Money Toad)
 List of lucky symbols

Notes

References

Japanese popular culture
Japanese dolls
Japanese folk religion
Japanese folklore
Japanese folk art
Cats in popular culture
Superstitions of Japan
Lucky symbols
Figurines
Cats in Japan
Cats in art
Cat folklore